Limitation Act is a stock short title used for legislation in Malaysia and the United Kingdom which relates to limitation of actions.

The Bill for an Act with this short title may have been known as a Limitation Bill during its passage through Parliament.

Limitation Acts may be a generic name which refers to all statutes with this short title or which relate to limitation of actions.

List

Malaysia
The Limitation Act 1953

United Kingdom
The Limitation (Enemies and War Prisoners) Act 1945 (8 & 9 Geo.6 c. 16)
The Limitation Act 1623 (21 Jac.1 c. 16)
The Limitation Act 1939 (2 & 3 Geo.6 c. 21)
The Law Reform (Limitation of Acts, etc.) Act 1954 (2 & 3 Eliz.2 c. 36)
The Limitation Act 1963 (c. 47)
The Limitation Act 1975 (c. 54)

England and Wales
The Limitation Amendment Act 1980 (c. 24)                                    
The Limitation Act 1980 (c. 58) (one repeal, with saving, extends to Northern Ireland)
The Foreign Limitation Periods Act 1984 (c. 16)

Scotland
The Prescription and Limitation (Scotland) Act 1973 (c. 52)
The Prescription and Limitation (Scotland) Act 1984 (c. 45)

Northern Ireland

Limitation Order

A number of Orders in Council with this title, and variations of it, have been passed. The change in nomenclature is due to the demise of the Parliament of Northern Ireland and the imposition of direct rule. These orders are considered to be primary legislation.

The Limitation Amendment (Northern Ireland) Order 1982 (S.I. 1982/339 (N.I. 7))
The Foreign Limitation Periods (Northern Ireland) Order 1985 (S.I. 1985/754 (N.I. 5))
The Limitation (Amendment) (Northern Ireland) Order 1987 (S.I. 1987/1629 (N.I. 17)
The Limitation (Northern Ireland) Order 1989 (S.I. 1989/1339 (N.I. 11))

See also
List of short titles

Lists of legislation by short title
Statutes of limitations